The South Carolina Gamecocks football statistical leaders are individual statistical leaders of the South Carolina Gamecocks football program in various categories, including passing, rushing, receiving, total offense, defensive stats, and kicking. Within those areas, the lists identify single-game, single-season, and career leaders. The Gamecocks represent University of South Carolina in the NCAA's Southeastern Conference.

Although South Carolina began competing in intercollegiate football in 1892, the school's official record book does not generally contain entries from before the late 1940s, as records before this time are often incomplete and inconsistent. These lists are dominated by more recent players for several reasons:
 Since 1949, seasons have increased from 10 games to 11 and then 12 games in length.
 The NCAA didn't allow freshmen to play varsity football until 1972 (with the exception of the World War II years), allowing players to have four-year careers.
 Bowl games only began counting toward single-season and career statistics in 2002. The Gamecocks have played in 10 bowl games since then, allowing players on these teams an additional game to accumulate statistics.

These lists are updated through the 2020 season.

Passing

Passing yards

Passing touchdowns

Rushing

Rushing yards

Rushing touchdowns

Receiving

Receptions

Receiving yards

Receiving touchdowns

Total offense
Total offense is the sum of passing and rushing statistics. It does not include receiving or returns.

Total offense yards

Total touchdowns

Defense

Interceptions

Tackles

Sacks

Kicking

Field goals made

Field goal percentage

References

South Carolina